The Sun Odyssey 31 is a French sailboat that was designed by Daniel Andrieu as a cruiser and first built in 1991.

The Sun Odyssey 31 is a dervivative of the 1986 Sun Light 30 and is related to the 1991 Sun Fast 31 design.

Production
The design was built by Jeanneau in France, from 1991 to 1997, but it is now out of production.

Design
The Sun Odyssey 31 is a recreational keelboat, built predominantly of fiberglass, with wood trim. It has a masthead sloop rig. The hull has a raked stem a reverse transom with a swimming platform, an internally mounted spade-type rudder controlled by a tiller and a fixed fin keel or optional shoal-draft keel. It displaces  and carries  of ballast.

The boat is fitted with a Japanese Yanmar 2GM20 diesel engine for docking and maneuvering.

The design was built with two factory interior layouts. The first layout has sleeping accommodation for four people, with a double "V"-berth in the bow cabin and an aft cabin with a double berth on the port side. There is a "U"-shaped settee with a table in the main cabin. The galley is located on the port side admidships. The galley is straight and is equipped with a two-burner stove, an ice box and a sink. A navigation station is aft the galley, on the port side. The head is located abeam the companionway ladder on the starboard side.

The second optional interior layout has sleeping accommodation for six people, with a double "V"-berth in the bow cabin, two straight settees, with a drop-leaf table in the main cabin and an aft cabin with a double berth on the port side. The galley is located on the port side, at the companionway ladder. The galley is "L"-shaped and is equipped with a two-burner stove, an ice box and a sink. A navigation station is opposite the galley, on the starboard side. The head is located beside the companionway ladder on the starboard side. 

See also
List of sailing boat types

References

External links

Sun Odyssey 31 video tour

Keelboats
1990s sailboat type designs
Sailing yachts
Sailboat type designs by Daniel Andrieu
Sailboat types built by Jeanneau